Aldealafuente is a municipality located in the province of Soria, Castile and León, Spain. According to the 2004 census (INE), the municipality has a population of 129 inhabitants.

History
The place during the Middle Ages belonged to the Comunidad de Villa y Tierra de Soria, which formed part of Sexmo de Lubia.

Settlements

References

Municipalities in the Province of Soria